The 2023 Busch Light Clash at The Coliseum was a NASCAR Cup Series race held on February 5, 2023, at Los Angeles Memorial Coliseum in Los Angeles, California. Contested over 150 laps, it was the first exhibition race of the 2023 NASCAR Cup Series season.

Format and eligibility
On September 14, 2021, NASCAR announced that the Busch Clash will move to the Los Angeles Memorial Coliseum. On December 22, 2022, the format for the 2023 Clash was announced:

 The event is open for all teams and drivers.
 A total of 350 laps in six races.
 The 36 charter teams and up to four open teams will participate in qualifying. Should more than 40 teams enter the race, it is unknown if qualifying will determine who advances to heat races.
 Based on lap times, cars are put in one of four heat races of 25 laps each. The top five drivers in each heat advance to the feature.
 All non qualifying drivers are assigned to one of two 50 lap heat races. The top three drivers in each heat advance to the feature.
 The highest driver in 2022 Cup Series points standings not in will also advance to the feature in the last position.
 The feature is 150 laps and will have 27 cars start the race.

Entry list 
 (R) denotes rookie driver.
 (i) denotes driver who is ineligible for series driver points.

Practice
Martin Truex Jr. was the fastest in the practice session with a time of 13.361 with an average speed of 
.

Practice results

Qualifying

Qualifying results

Qualifying heat races
Aric Almirola scored the pole for the race after winning the first qualifying heat race.

Race 1

Race 2

Race 3

Race 4

"Last Chance" qualifying race 1

"Last Chance" qualifying race 2

Starting lineup

Race

Race results

Media

Television
Fox covered the race on the television side. Mike Joy, Clint Bowyer, and three-time NASCAR Cup Series champion and co-owner of Stewart-Haas Racing Tony Stewart handled the call in the booth for the race, while pit reporters Jamie Little and Regan Smith as well as Larry McReynolds handled interviews. Chris Myers and Jamie McMurray were the host and analyst in the studio.

Radio
MRN covered the radio call for the race, which was also simulcast on Sirius XM NASCAR Radio. Alex Hayden and Jeff Striegle called the action from the broadcast booth when the field raced down the front straightaway. Dan Hubbard called the action for MRN when the field raced down the backstretch. Steve Post, Kim Coon, Brienne Pedigo, and Jason Toy covered the action for MRN on pit lane.

References

Busch Light Clash at The Coliseum
Busch Light Clash at The Coliseum
Busch Light Clash at The Coliseum
NASCAR races at Los Angeles Memorial Coliseum